Erik Lawrence Grant Lea (October 15, 1892 – April 28, 1979) was a Norwegian ship-owner, banker, insurer and mill owner. He became one of the most mythical tycoons of the boom years of World War I in Norway.

The myth 
Those that grew up in Bergen after World War II could hardly avoid hearing the fairy tale about Lea, a fellow citizen, who became the richest ship owner in the world, married an Indian princess, and then lost everything and settled with his princess in some distant corner of Sognefjord.

The reality 
Behind this myth there was a turbulent life. In his days of wealth and power he owned 10 shipping companies, a bank and three insurance companies. His ships crossed oceans all over the world. He had 500 agents on three continents. In 1917 his agents signed 60,000 fire policies, insured the whole fishing fleet of  Ålesund and little by little most of the Norwegian fleet. His spouse Hilda was no princess, but the daughter of a major and an Indian woman from a wealthy business family from Bangalore. In 1922 Lea lost everything and settled in Gjølanger in Fjaler in Sunnfjord, Sogn og Fjordane and had to start from scratch earning a living for himself and his family.

Childhood 
He was born in Bergen, Norway, the son of Lars Lea and Anna Bertine Magnussen, and married to  Hilda Constance, née Connor, born 1889 in Bangalore, India, died 1960 in Fjaler, later remarried to Hildur Augusta Sørensdatter Tyssedal, born 1916 in Fjaler. He was the fifth of eight brothers and sisters, raised in a large apartment in Håkonsgate in Bergen. He attended the Hambro primary school up to age 14, when his father took him out of school and began to personally impart him a business education.

Career 
At sixteen he started working as a clerk, later employed by Kjær og Isdahl (Kjær and Isdahl), a substantial shipping business, where he was quickly promoted office manager. In 1914 he bought his first steam ship and in 1915 he started his own shipping company. In 1915–16 he bought and sold ships for 30 million NKr (approximately US$4.6 million). In 1917 he sold six of his companies to Bjørnstad og Brækhus, then founded Leas Assuranseseslskab A/S (Lea's Insurance Company Inc.). Shortly after he added the insurance companies Jupiter and National. He then founded Leas Aktie- og Bankierforretning A/S (Lea's Stock and Bankers Enterprise Inc.).

These operations were sold to a consortium for a substantial sum of money. He regretted the sale and bought them back a little later for about the same amount of money. In the meantime, as the wartime shipping bonanza ended, his companies ran into a crisis, and were declared bankrupt by 1921. In 1922 Bergens Kreditbank foreclosed on his home (now Solhaug school) and the  surrounding of land.

A new start, another life 
After his bankruptcy he moved to a little, but still operating saw mill in Gjølanger (Fjaler municipality, Sogn og Fjordane county), which his creditors had not attacked. He built a dam to float timber to the mill and a salmon ladder. He also established a grain mill, a grocery shop, a steam ship quay, a telephone line and a power station.  He also operated a lime kiln in Smilden, on the north bank of Åfjorden (a fjord), between Hyllestad and Sørbøvåg. It was a hard life with little sleep. While building a new house for himself in Gjøanger he lived in Hellevik and had to walk the distance of five kilometers twice each day. From Hellevik to the Smilden kiln the distance was 20 km along a footpath. He also started a forestry operation. By the beginning of the 60's, some 30 years later, he had planted altogether 200,000 spruce trees.

From the bottom again 
After the Second World War, his new businesses slowly kept growing. In the more or less roadless Dalsfjorden area, Gjølanger became the place with the most frequent steam ship arrivals. But in 1951 the mill, the power plant, and the shop were all destroyed by fire. He was underinsured and once again had to start from almost zero, with some insurance money and help from his fellow villagers. 
His wife Hilda died suddenly in 1960. His daughter from his first marriage, Sunniva, married Johannes Gaussereide.
He later married Hildur Tyssedal, who had been employed in his shop.

Public contributions 
At the top of his career about 1916–17, he bought land in the outskirts of Bergen. The land near his residence, Lea Hall, he bought to build one family houses with garden for workers. He made development plans for the area. The area and plan was sold to the public authorities for a modest sum of money. The plans were later partly realized. He engaged architect Schumann Olsen to make a development plan for a garden suburb at Finnebergåsen. Also this area was sold to the public authorities for a modest sum. His rights in Lake Solheim was given to the same public authorities without any compensation. He thus willfully forwent substantial wealth and a prospect of profits in favor of the public interests.

He also willingly contributed substantial sums of money to the benefit of refugees and catastrophe stricken people and to public benefit in Bergen city.

When the American Dr. Bentham died and left an invaluable collection of ethnic Indian artifacts, his widow tried to sell the collection. But no American museums were willing to pay the sum required. Lea then raised the money and bought the collection and donated it to Bergen Museum where the collection can be seen today.

Other 
Lea joined the Norwegian Home Guard immediately after the war and was an active officer until he approached eighty.  He was educated in the military and was appointed as lieutenant. When 78 he accomplished the Niemegen march (as many times before). At 70 he was awarded the Idrettsmerket (the Athletics medal). He has also been awarded a number of distinctions and medals. He has also accomplished a number of other demanding marches.

In 1923, when 30, he converted to Catholicism and in 1938 he built his own private chapel at Gjølanger. The vicar in the Catholic parish in Bergen held masses there at Lea's birthday and 17 May, the national constitution day. The Nobel Prize winner, the Norwegian Catholic author Sigrid Undset was also his guest there.

Lea had emphatic cultural and literary interests. He had social connections with the Norwegian poet Jakob Sande who frequently visited Gjølanger, and the Swiss-German writer Karl Friedrich Kurz, who lived in Vårdal on the north side of Dalsfjorden facing Gjølanger.

Lea also wrote poetry himself.

He planted Sequoia gigantea trees. One of them has survived to this day and has reached a height of about 4 m. It is not in very good health, but is still growing.

He died in 1979 in the municipality of Fjaler in Sogn og Fjordane county.

Literary work 
Erik Grant Lea: Røsslyng og Tanker 1970. Poems

Some poems in K. Stub og S. Osnes: Der Stillheten Gror, 1996.

References 
 Norvald Tveit: Fra Gull til Grønne Skoger. Gyldendal Norsk Forlag 1972.
 Jon Gunnar Arntsen (red.): Bergensere i Tusen år. Kunnskapsforlaget 2005.
 O. W. Fasting (red.): Erik Grant Lea, Skibsrederi, Assuranse- og Bankvirksomhet. Og Bergens Nærings- og Forretningsliv i Tekst og Billeder, 1921.
 Bergens Arbeiderblad, article 13.10.1967.
 Bergens Tidende, article 30.09.1972.
 A. Thowsen: Vekst og Strukturendringer i Krisetider 1914–1939, vol. IV in Bergen og Sjøfarten, 1983.

Gjølanger

External links 

Smilden / Smilla
NRK Fylkesleksikon
Sound file. Lea intervjued 1963 by NRK's Steinar Brauteset

1892 births
1979 deaths
Norwegian businesspeople in insurance
People from Fjaler